Facinet Touré (1934 – 14 June 2021) was a Guinean military officer, and politician who served as Minister of Foreign Affairs and was a co-founder of the Military Committee of National Restoration.

References

1934 births
2021 deaths
Guinean politicians
Foreign Ministers of Guinea
People from Mamou